Santa Marina can refer to:

 Santa Marina Salina, a town on the Eolian Island, Italy
 Santa Marina, Campania, a town and comune in Campania, Italy
 Santa Marina (Córdoba), a church in Córdoba, Spain
 Santa Marina (Noreña), a parish in Noreña, Asturias, Spain
 Santamarina, a surname
 Club y Biblioteca Ramón Santamarina or Santamarina, a football club in Tandil, Buenos Aires Province, Argentina

See also
 Marina (disambiguation)
 Saint Marina (disambiguation)